The 1940 Cleveland Rams season was the team's fourth year with the National Football League and the fifth season in Cleveland.

Schedule

Standings

References
1940 Cleveland Rams Season at Pro-Football Reference

Cleveland Rams
Cleveland Rams seasons
Cleveland Rams